James Charles McElroy, Jr. (born October 4, 1953) is an American former professional basketball player. He was born in Cotton Plant, Arkansas.

A 6'3" guard from Central Michigan University, McElroy played in the National Basketball Association from 1975 to 1982 as a member of the New Orleans Jazz, Detroit Pistons, and Atlanta Hawks.  He averaged 9.9 points and 3.5 assists in his career and ranked tenth overall in total assists (453) during the 1978–79 NBA season.

External links

1953 births
Living people
African-American basketball players
American men's basketball players
Atlanta Hawks players
Basketball players from Arkansas
Central Michigan Chippewas men's basketball players
Detroit Pistons players
Junior college men's basketball players in the United States
New Orleans Jazz draft picks
New Orleans Jazz players
People from Cotton Plant, Arkansas
Shooting guards
21st-century African-American people
20th-century African-American sportspeople